Rezgui is a surname, and may refer to:

Rezgui derives from رزقي which means my living or my supper in Arabic.

 Rakia Rezgui (born 1996) - Tunisian handball player
 Wassim Rezgui (born 1986) - Tunisian football player 
Seifeddine Rezgui - alleged perpretator of the 2015 Sousse attacks
Rezgui Guizani (1934-2015) - Tunisian boxer

See also
Monder Rizki

References

Arabic-language surnames
Surnames of Tunisian origin
Surnames of Algerian origin